A State of Trance 2012 is the ninth compilation album in the A State of Trance compilation series mixed and compiled by Dutch DJ and record producer Armin van Buuren. It was released on 1 March 2012 by Armada Music.

Track listing

References

Armin van Buuren compilation albums
Electronic compilation albums
2012 compilation albums